The 2018–19 Dorados de Sinaloa season is the 16th season in the football club's history. The team will compete in Ascenso MX and Copa MX.

Coaching staff

Players

Squad information

Players and squad numbers last updated on 16 December 2018.Note: Flags indicate national team as has been defined under FIFA eligibility rules. Players may hold more than one non-FIFA nationality.

Competitions

Overview

Apertura

Liguilla

Quarter-finals

Semi-finals

Final

Apertura Copa MX

Group stage

Round of 16

Statistics

Goals

Hat-tricks

Own goals

Clean sheets

References

External links

Mexican football clubs 2018–19 season
2018–19 in Mexican football